The Thangal people, also known as the Thangal Naga, are a Tibeto-Burman ethnic group inhabiting Senapati district in the Northeast Indian state of Manipur. Presently there are 13 Thangal villages. They are found in eleven hill villages of the Senapati District. Mapao Thangal, Thangal Surung, Makeng Thangal, Tumnoupokpi, Tagaramphung (Yaikongpao), Ningthoupham and Mayakhang are some of the bigger villages.

They speak the Thangal language, which resembles Maram, and Rongmei.

Society
13 August is celebrated as Thangal Day. This is to commemorate the martyrdom of Lungthoubu Thangal, better known as Thangal Menjor, or popularly as Thangal general in the year 1891.

References

Scheduled Tribes of India
Naga people